John Leonard Burris (born May 8, 1945) is an American civil rights attorney, based in Oakland, California, known for his work in police brutality cases representing plaintiffs. The John Burris law firm practices employment, criminal defense, DUI, personal injury, and landlord tenant law.

John Burris practice grew notably when he represented Rodney King in his civil rights lawsuit against the Los Angeles Police Department and won $3.8 million against the LAPD. Since then, Burris has represented plaintiffs in a number of high-profile lawsuits against police departments across the state of California including the "Oakland Riders" case which settled for $10.9 million where a gang of Oakland officers were found to be planting evidence on citizens, which caused the federal government to investigate and oversee the Oakland Police Department to this day.

Recently, John Burris represented Celeste Guap in her cases against Northern California Police Departments for a number of officers exploiting and having sex with her while she was underage. Mr. Burris won a $989,000 settlement for Ms. Guap against the Oakland Police Department whose officers also face criminal charges for their sexual misconduct with a minor.

Mr. Burris won a $11.3 million judgment at trial against the San Jose Police Department, after an officer shot Hung Lam in the back causing him to become paralyzed.

John Burris also represented Oscar Grant's mother in her lawsuit against BART Police which settled for $1.3 million, where Bay Area Rapid Transit Officer Johannes Mehserle shot the 22-year-old in the back while he was handcuffed on the Fruitvale BART train platform in Oakland, California on New Year's Day in 2009. The facts of the case were later depicted in the movie "Fruitvale Station" starring Michael B. Jordan, which won multiple film awards.

Mr. Burris also represents Mario Woods' mother in her case against the San Francisco Police Department where a group of officers were captured on video shooting her son, Mario Woods, on December 2, 2015 that caused large protests throughout the Bay Area and ultimately resulted in the resignation of the SFPD Chief of Police Greg Suhr.

Burris also has represented notable clients such as Tupac Shakur, Latrell Sprewell, Gary Payton Keyshawn Johnson and Barry Bonds.

Early life and education
Burris was born in May 1945 in Vallejo, California. He graduated from Vallejo High School in 1963. He attended Solano Community College in the mid-1960s and later earned a bachelor's degree in accounting from Golden Gate University. Burris graduated from UC Berkeley Graduate School of Business (MBA) in 1970 and UC Berkeley School of Law in 1973 with a Juris Doctor degree. He worked for Chicago law firm Jenner & Block immediately after law school, and went on to become a member of the California Bar in 1976.

Career
Burris's work in police brutality cases began in 1979 when he was an investigator in the district attorney's office working on the case of the killing of 14-year-old Melvin Black.  Burris's 1999 book, Blue vs. Black, is about the problem of police brutality against African-Americans.

Burris "has earned millions of dollars" in filing hundreds of police brutality and high-profile lawsuits, including a $3.8 million verdict for Rodney King and a $42,000 settlement in a suit brought on behalf of Tupac Shakur.

Rodney King civil trial 

Burris's practice grew notably when he represented Rodney King in his civil rights lawsuit against the Los Angeles Police Department and won $3.8 million against the LAPD.

Oakland Riders Case 

Burris has represented plaintiffs in a number of high-profile lawsuits against police departments across the state of California including the "Oakland Riders" case which settled for $10.9 million where a gang of Oakland officers were found to be planting evidence on citizens, which caused the federal government to investigate and oversee the Oakland Police Department to this day.

Oscar Grant Case 

John Burris also represented Oscar Grant's mother in her lawsuit against Bart Police which settled for $1.3 million, where Bay Area Rapid Transit Officer Mehserle infamously shot 22-year-old in the back while he was handcuffed on the Fruitvale BART train platform in Oakland, California on New Year's Day in 2009. The facts of the case were later depicted in the movie "Fruitvale Station" starring Michael B. Jordan, which won multiple film awards.

Barry Bonds 

John Burris represented Barry Bonds.

Mario Woods 
Burris represented Mario Woods' mother in her case against the San Francisco Police Department where a group of officers were captured on video shooting her son, Mario Woods, on December 2, 2015 that caused large protests throughout the Bay Area and ultimately resulted in the resignation of the SFPD Chief of Police Greg Suhr.

Celeste Guap 
Recently, John Burris represented Celeste Guap (also known as Jasmine Abuslin) in her cases against Northern California Police Departments for a number of officers exploiting and sexually assaulting her when she was underage. Mr. Burris won a $989,000 settlement for Ms. Guap against the Oakland Police Department whose officers also face criminal charges for their sexual misconduct with a minor.

Brandon T.
In 1996, Burris defended pro bono Brandon T., a six-year-old Richmond, California boy accused of and prosecuted for attempted murder of an infant, in a crime that made national news.

Agustin Gonsalez

In March 2021, Burris and his associate Ben Nisenbaum announced a $3.3 million settlement of a lawsuit against the city of Hayward, California. Burris represented the family of Agustin Gonsalez, who was shot to death by two Hayward police officers in 2018. The officers were responding to a call reporting that a man was threatening people with a knife. The officers killed Gonzalez, and then discovered that he was carrying a small safety razor. He had 14 bullet wounds. Gonzalez, 29, was an employee of Tesla, Inc., and had two children. His family reported that he was undergoing a mental health crisis.

Personal life
Burris is married to Cheryl Amana-Burris, a law professor at North Carolina Central University. and lives in Oakland Hills, Oakland, California.

Awards and honors 

 Dr. Huey P. Newton Trail Blazer & Legacy Award Keepers of our Culture June  2018
 Mount Zion Baptist Church **** Scholarship Foundation Education and  Community Service Award: In Recognition of your Indelible Contributions, Dedication, and Commitment to Working with the people in the Bay Area June  2018
 Love Not Blood Campaign Unsung Hero 2017
 Victoria Consistory #25 Ancient Accepted Scottish Rite of Freemasonry; For your Consistent and Outstanding Contributions you have made to the Oakland Community throughout the years. You have helped bring light where there was darkness and truth where it was hidden from the helpless. – June 2017
 The National Bar Association Hall of Fame Inductee 2017
 California Legislative Black Caucus Civil Rights Leadership Award January 2017
 The Global Directory of Who's Who Top Lawyer Lifetime Member – In Recognition of Hard Work, Dedication, and Contributions to the Legal Profession 2016
 NATIONAL “40” ASSEMBLY of THE LINKS’ CO -FOUNDER’S AWARD, June 2016
 Eddie Walker Foundation's Life Time Achievement Award for Social Justice, June, 2016, Oakland
 The Bishop Richard Allen Award for Excellence in Social Justice; in recognition of continuous service for Justice, Freedom and Equality; presented by the Methodist AME Church for the 5th Episcopal District 2016
 Parks Chapel AME Church's Community Service Award, February 2016, Oakland,
 Kappa Alpha Psi fraternity, Berkeley Alumni's Chapter,”Knowledge is Power-for Civil Rights Advocacy and Community Service Award” January 2016
 The Saint Leo School “The Great Hero Award” , June 2015, Oakland
 National Academy of Personal Injury Attorneys—2015 Nationally Ranked top 10 attorney Award
 Empire “the Battle of the Bay, San Francisco For Inspirational message as the Keynote speaker – 2015
 San Mateo Bar Association, — Community Service Award, Redwood City, Oct. 2015
 Sun Reporter, Talented 25 Selection, December 2015, San Francisco Ca
 Merritt College’s Presidents Excellence Award June 2011
 Charles Houston’s Hall of Fame award Dec. 2015 – In appreciation of his years of service in the struggle for social justice.
 National Bar Association Vince Monroe Townsend Legacy Award, July 2015
 National Lawyers Guild, San Francisco Chapter’s Champion of Justice Award, March 2015
 John F. Kennedy University Black Law Students Association 2013
 Legal Leader San Francisco Top Rated Lawyers of 2013
 San Francisco Chronicle Profile “Powerhouse Behind Police Reform, September 2012
 Kappa Alpha Psi Fraternity, Western Province, Keynote Speaker Appreciation Award, Berkeley Alumni Chapter, 65th Western Province Council 2012
 EMPIRE COLLEGE SCHOOL OF LAW, given as Token Appreciation for law School Commencement Address for class of 2012
 Merritt College President’s Excellence Award; For Your Inspiration, Generous commitment of Time, and Support to Our Endeavors 2011
 Southern University Law Center 1983 Actions SULC 2011
 National Bar Association’s Heman Marion Sweatt Award for excellence in the legal profession, March 2011
 Golden Gate University ‘ Profile in Prominence 2011
 Solano County's Council of Negro Women Achievement Award February 2011
 Solano Community college: Living the Dream Achievement Award, 2011
 National Council of Negro Women, Inc. Dr. Martin Luther King Jr. Commemorative Breakfast 2011
 San Francisco Daily Journal's Top 100 Leading “Lawyers in California, 2009
 National Bar Association's C. Francis Stradford Award: the highest award given by the association for inspiration, and contribution to the legal profession
 100 Black Men Achievement Award Bay Area- Lifetime Achievement (December 2008)
 California Association of Equal Rights Professionals (June 2008)
 North Carolina Achievement Award For Justice Presented By The American Justice Association (June 2008)
 Arthur A. Fletcher Lifetime Achievement Award (July 2008)
 Keeper of the Torch Award, by Oakland-based Community Groups (September 2006)
 Courage Award, by the Civil Rights Concert Series (October 2007)
 Top 100 Influential Lawyers in California, by California Daily Journal (September 2005)
 9th Congressional District Resolution for Achievement as Civil Rights Lawyer and Community Service on 60th birthday, (June 2005)
 Tribute on 60th birthday from the Alameda County Board of Supervisors, for outstanding contribution to legal community of Alameda County (June 2005)
 16th Assembly District Resolution on 60th birthday for Outstanding Contribution to the Legal Profession in the State of California. (June 2005)
 Certificate of Appreciation, HUD- Regional Office, Keynote Speaker at Black History Celebration, (February 2004)
 Clinton White Outstanding Trial Advocacy Award, Charles Houston Bar Association, (December 2003)
 2003 Peace and Justice Award, California State University- Center for African Peace and Conflict Resolution (May 2003)
 The Black American Writer's Scholarship Role Model Peace Award, O’town Passion Community Services, Inc. (2003)
 Local Hero Award, PUEBLO Annual Dinner (2001)
 Moot court trial attorney Stanford University (1996 – present)
 Hasting College of Law Trial Advocacy Program (1980 – present)
 Member, Oakland Municipal Court, Pro tem, 1993 Member: Lawyers Committee for Civil Rights Presently, board Member, National Police Accountability Project President, California Association of Black Lawyers, 1979-1980
 Charles Houston Bar Association, President, 1979-1980

Recent Presentations 

 Chapman college Law School, National Justice Symposium, Status of Policing in California, Orange
 National Bar Association seminar”Police Litigation: Recognizing and bringing Section 1983 cases”, panelist; St. Louis, Mo, July 2016
 Ninth Circuit Annual Conference,”Ferguson and Where Do We Go From Here” Panelist; Big Sky, Montana July 2016
 Podcast, Police Brutality in This Golden State by this Golden State, Randy Shandobil, June 2016
 Empire National Mock Trials Honors, Keynote speaker, San Francisco, Ca November 2015

References

External links
 John Burris Law firm Website

American civil rights lawyers
Golden Gate University alumni
UC Berkeley School of Law alumni
Living people
Lawyers from Oakland, California
Police brutality in the United States
1945 births
Activists from California
People associated with Jenner & Block